The Chinese Academy of Social Sciences (CASS) is a Chinese research institute and think tank based in the People's Republic of China. 

CASS is under the auspices of the State Council of the People's Republic of China. CASS houses the Graduate School of Chinese Academy of Social Sciences, which later became the University of Chinese Academy of Social Sciences.

According to Chen Daoyin, a former professor at the Shanghai University of Political Science and Law, CASS "is not so much an academic institution but a body to formulate party ideology to support the leadership."

History
The CASS was established in May 1977, based on the 14 research units of the Department of Philosophy and Social Sciences of the Chinese Academy of Sciences, with the aim of promoting the development of philosophy and social sciences, under the instruction of  Deng Xiaoping. The first president was Hu Qiaomu. In 2022, Gao Xiang was appointed Chinese Communist Party Committee Secretary and president of CASS.

The Dictionary Editing Office of the Institute of Linguistics edits Xiandai Hanyu Cidian.

The predecessor of the Chinese Academy of Social Sciences was the Department of Philosophy and Social Sciences of the Chinese Academy of Sciences, established in 1955.

Structure

, CASS has over 3,200 resident scholars. As of November 2020, the Chinese Academy of Social Sciences has 6 university departments, 42 research institutes, 6 functional departments, 5 directly affiliated institutions, and 3 directly affiliated companies. Of its functional departments, five are focused on research.

Predecessor 
The China Social Sciences Publishing House was established on 14 June 1978, under the auspices of the Chinese Academy of Social Sciences.

Publishing house 
The China Social Sciences Press was established in June 1978 under the auspices of the Chinese Academy of Social Sciences, and has published over 8,000 books since its inception.

List of presidents
Hu Qiaomu: 1977–1982
Ma Hong: 1982–1985
Hu Qiaomu: 1985–1988
Hu Sheng: 1988–1998
Li Tieying: 1998–2003
Chen Kuiyuan: 2003–2013
Wang Weiguang: April 2013 – March 2018
Xie Fuzhan: March 2018 – May 2022
Shi Taifeng: May 2022 – Incumbent
Source: China Social Science Network

See also
 Chinese Academy of Sciences
 Shanghai Academy of Social Sciences
 University of Chinese Academy of Social Sciences
 Graduate School of Chinese Academy of Social Sciences
 Imperial Hanlin Academy
 Scientific publishing in China

References

External links
 

 
1977 establishments in China
Organizations based in Beijing
Organizations established in 1977
Research institutes in China
Science and technology in the People's Republic of China
Think tanks based in China
Members of the International Science Council
National academies of arts and humanities